EGSL may refer to:

 Andrewsfield aerodrome (ICAO: EGSL) in Braintree, Essex, England
 Earl Gregg Swem Library at the College of William & Mary in Williamsburg, Virginia